Sven Harald Linderot (8 October 1889, in Skedevi, Finspång, Östergötland County – 7 April 1956) was a Swedish Communist leader. He was born Sven Harald Larsson but changed his surname to Linderot in 1918. Among party members he was also known as Sven-Lasse.

Linderot became active in the Swedish Social Democratic Party in 1914 and he joined the left opposition at the party split in 1917, which soon became the Communist Party of Sweden. During the Finnish Civil War he was active in Committee against the Finnish White Terror. Linderot was one of the leaders of the party's youth organization and in late 1921 he was sent to Moscow to work for the Communist International (Comintern). He was also editor of the party newspaper Norrskensflamman from 1925 to 1927.

When the party split in 1929, Linderot emerged as one of the main figures in the pro-Comintern faction together with Hugo Sillén, which by orders of Moscow expelled a majority of the party's members, including the leadership. Linderot replaced the expelled Nils Flyg as leader of the party, a position he held from 1929 to 1951.

In 1939, Sven Linderot was elected to the upper house of the Parliament of Sweden, where he had a seat until 1949.

References

1889 births
1956 deaths
People from Finspång Municipality
Members of the Riksdag from the Left Party (Sweden)
Swedish communists
Leaders of political parties in Sweden
Swedish Comintern people
Members of the Första kammaren